Elisabeth "Lisette" Anthonius Maria Ignatius Sevens (born 29 June 1949) is a retired Dutch field hockey defender, who won the gold medal at the 1984 Summer Olympics.

From 1974 to 1984, she played a total number of 125 international matches for Holland, in which she scored five goals. Sevens retired from international field hockey after the 1984 Summer Olympics in Los Angeles, California, where she captained the team.

References

External links
 
Personal website

1949 births
Living people
Dutch female field hockey players
Olympic field hockey players of the Netherlands
Field hockey players at the 1984 Summer Olympics
Olympic gold medalists for the Netherlands
Sportspeople from Helmond
Olympic medalists in field hockey
Medalists at the 1984 Summer Olympics
20th-century Dutch women
20th-century Dutch people